Cardamine hirsuta, commonly called hairy bittercress, is an annual or biennial species of plant in the family Brassicaceae, and is edible as a salad green. It is common in moist areas around the world.

Description

Depending on the climate C. hirsuta may complete two generations in a year, one in the spring and one in the fall; also depending on the climate, the seeds may germinate in the fall and the plants may remain green throughout the winter before flowering in the spring. It often grows a rosette of leaves at the base of the stem, while there may be leaves on the upright stem, most of the leaves will be part of the basal rosette. The leaves in this rosette are pinnately divided into 8–15 leaflets which have short stems connecting them to the petiole. These basal leaves are often 3.5–15 cm long. The leaflets are round to ovate in shape and may have smooth or dentate edges. The leaflet at the tip of the leaf (terminal leaflet) will be larger than the other leaflets and round to reniform in shape. The cauline (attached to the upright stem) leaves are also pinnately divided, with fewer leaflets, and generally smaller than the basal leaves; these leaves will be borne on a petiole and are 1.2–5.5 cm long. The stems, petioles, and upper surfaces of the cauline leaves are sparsely hairy.

The small white flowers are borne in a raceme without any bracts, soon followed by the seeds and often continuing to flower as the first seeds ripen. The flowers have (4) white petals (which may be lacking but are mostly present) which are 1.5–4.5 mm long and spatulate shaped. The flowers also have (4) stamens of equal height instead of the 6 which are found in most closely related plants. Pollens are elongated, approximately 32 microns in length.

Below the flowers there are 4 sepals which are oblong shaped and 1.5–2.5 mm long and .3–.7 mm wide. The seeds are borne in upright pointing siliquae which are straight and 1.5–2.5 cm long and 1–1.4mm in diameter. When the fruit is ripe the valves on the siliquae will coil tightly from the bottom to the top after being touched and burst explosively, sending the seeds flying far from the parent plant. This seed dispersal strategy is referred to as ballochory and is a type of rapid plant movement.

Hairy bittercress is very similar to Cardamine flexuosa. Some differences are that C. hirsuta stems are hairless and the leaves do not clasp the stems, as in C.flexuosa. It has only 4 stamens, while C. flexuosa has 6 stamens, and the fruits of C. hirsuta overtop the flowers whereas in C. flexuosa the fruits do not overtop the younger flowers. The fruits grow in a thin pod arranged as a single row.

Habitat and distribution
It is commonly found in damp, recently disturbed soil, open ground, turf and waste places and native to Europe as far east as the Caucasus, and to North Africa. These conditions are prevalent in nursery or garden centre plants, and hairy bittercress seeds may be introduced with those plants. Once established, it is difficult to eradicate. The tiny flowers are attractive to a few early butterflies, including (in the United States) spring azure (Celastrina ladon) and falcate orange-tip (Anthocharis midea).

It is native to Eurasia but has been introduced in many countries across the world. Its range includes but is not limited to: Argentina, Australia, Canada, China, Colombia, Costa Rica, Ecuador, Gabon, Great Britain, India, Japan, Laos, Madagascar, Mexico, Pakistan, Panama, Peru, Philippines, South Africa, Sri Lanka, Thailand, Turkmenistan, United States, Venezuela, and Vietnam.

The 1889 book 'The Useful Native Plants of Australia' records that it was also called "Lady's Smock" and that "This and other species afford excellent pot-herbs when luxuriant and flaccid. The present one is a common weed almost throughout the world."

Etymology and naming
Binomial etymology
Cardamine is Dioscorides' name for cress. It is derived from Greek.
Hirsuta means "hairy" or "hirsute".
Common names
Other common or country names include lamb's cress, land cress, hoary bitter cress, spring cress, flick weed, and shot weed (or lambscress, landcress, hoary bittercress, springcress, flickweed, and shotweed). Some of these common names may be shared with other plants in the family Brassicaceae and are therefore of limited usefulness since they may be shared. As Old English stune, the plant is cited as one of the herbs invoked in the pagan Anglo-Saxon Nine Herbs Charm, recorded in the 10th century.

Uses 
The leaves are edible raw and other tender parts of the plant can be cooked.

References

External links

http://biology.burke.washington.edu/herbarium/imagecollection.php?Genus=Cardamine&Species=hirsuta

hirsuta
Edible plants
Palearctic flora
Flora of Europe
Flora of Asia
Plants described in 1753
Taxa named by Carl Linnaeus